The Richmond, an electoral district of the Legislative Assembly in the Australian state of New South Wales, was created in 1880 and abolished in 1913.


Election results

Elections in the 1910s

1910

Elections in the 1900s

1907

1904

1901

Elections in the 1890s

1898

1895

1894

1891

Elections in the 1880s

1889

1887

1885

1882

1880

References

New South Wales state electoral results by district